Donald MacArthur Ross, Lord Ross, PC, FRSE (born 29 March 1927) is a former Lord Justice Clerk; the second most senior judge in Scotland.

Personal life
He was born in Dundee and educated at the High School of Dundee and the University of Edinburgh. Lord Ross is married with two daughters and six grandchildren.

Career
He was admitted to the Faculty of Advocates and became a King's Counsel in 1964. He has been Sheriff of Ayr and Bute (1972 to 1973), Dean of the Faculty of Advocates (1973 to 1976), and a Senator of the College of Justice on 17 November 1976. He served as Lord Justice Clerk from 1985 until 1997.

Ross also received an Honorary Doctorate from Heriot-Watt University in 1988

In 1990 and 1991 he was Lord High Commissioner to the General Assembly of the Church of Scotland. He is an elder at Canongate Kirk in Edinburgh.

In 1997-2001 was Chairman of the Judicial Studies Committee for Scotland. He became a Privy Counsellor in 1985 and was elected fellow of the Royal Society of Edinburgh in 1988, where he was Vice-President from 1999 until 2002. He is currently the Honorary President of The Dundee High School Old Boys' Club.

He sentenced paedophile Bill Kelly, who pleaded guilty to 14 charges of indecent sexual assault on children, to a custodial sentence of 12 months as he deemed the victims to "not have suffered long term damage".

References

1927 births
Living people
People from Dundee
People educated at the High School of Dundee
Alumni of the University of Edinburgh
Members of the Privy Council of the United Kingdom
Fellows of the Royal Society of Edinburgh
Lords Justice Clerk
Deans of the Faculty of Advocates
Scottish King's Counsel
Elders of the Church of Scotland
Lords High Commissioner to the General Assembly of the Church of Scotland
Senators of the College of Justice
Scottish sheriffs